National Jet Systems, formerly Cobham Aviation Services Australia - Airline Services, is an Australian regional airline based at Adelaide Airport, operating regular scheduled services as part of the QantasLink brand.

History

Foundation and early years

National Jet Systems was established in 1989 and started operations on 1 July 1990. Initial flights commenced in 1991 on behalf of Australian Airlines, mainly to tourist destinations in northern Australia, operating a fleet of four British Aerospace 146-100 aircraft under Australian’s Airlink brand. 

In 1992, Australian Airlines was acquired by Qantas, and the aircraft operated by National Jet on behalf of Airlink were repainted in a modified Qantas livery. The fleet was expanded in 1993 with the addition of three leased BAe 146-200 aircraft and two chartered BAe 146-300 aircraft, which commenced operations in 1994 from Brisbane and Cairns, respectively.  

In 1994, National Jet Express was established as a subsidiary to operate charter and scheduled services using National Jet's own branding, as well as freighter aircraft on behalf of Australian Air Express. Another subsidiary, Surveillance Australia, was also awarded the Australian Coastwatch contract to operate fixed-wing aerial surveillance aircraft and patrols in the Australian Exclusive Economic Zone (AEEZ).

In 1999, National Jet Systems, including National Jet Express and Surveillance Australia, were acquired by Cobham for £24.5 million. 

In 2002, Qantas launched QantasLink as a single brand for their regional airline subsidiaries and operations, and the livery on aircraft operated for QantasLink was updated to reflect the new name. 

In 2005, the airline commenced operating ex-Jetstar Boeing 717-200 aircraft on behalf of QantasLink in Western Australia, and transferred the remaining BAe 146 fleet to its National Jet Express subsidiary. All eught 717s formerly operated by Jetstar were transferred to National Jet Systems by October 2007.

In March 2007, the Boeing 717 operations agreement was renewed, and included an expansion of the fleet from eight to eleven aircraft. National Jet also commenced a program with Qantas and Rolls-Royce to upgrade the aircraft to the 'High Gross Weight' specification, which increased their thrust from 18,500lbs to 21,000lbs per engine, and was aimed at improving passenger-carrying performance in hot conditions.

In 2009, National Jet Systems was rebranded Cobham Aviation Services Australia - Airline Services to align its branding with the broader Cobham Group and to differentiate its role from that of National Jet Express.

Development since 2010
In 2011, the contract for operation of Boeing 717 aircraft on behalf of QantasLink was extended until 2018. Valued at $AUD500 million, the extension also increased the size of the B717 fleet from 11 to 13 aircraft, and expanded operations into Queensland.

In 2013, an additional five Boeing 717 jets were acquired to support flights from Canberra to Brisbane, Melbourne and Sydney.

In April 2015, the company ceased performing heavy maintenance on the QantasLink Boeing 717 fleet as a result of the work moving in-house to Qantas.

In July 2016, the contract for operation of Boeing 717 aircraft on behalf of QantasLink was renewed for a further 10 years. The value of the contract was stated as being $AUD1.2 billion.

In January 2020, it was included in the takeover of Cobham by Advent International. In May 2020 Qantas purchased the National Jet Systems division, with National Jet Express and Surveillance Australia remaining under Cobham ownership. The transition to Qantas ownership was completed in July 2020. In August 2020 the bases at Cairns Airport and Perth Airport were closed.

Destinations

National Jet Systems serves the following destinations as part of Qantas Link:

Australian Capital Territory
Canberra - Canberra Airport Hub
New South Wales
Coffs Harbour - Coffs Harbour Airport
Sydney -  Sydney Airport Hub
Northern Territory
Alice Springs - Alice Springs Airport
Ayers Rock - Ayers Rock Airport
Darwin - Darwin International Airport
Queensland
Cairns - Cairns Airport
Brisbane - Brisbane Airport Hub
Rockhampton - Rockhampton Airport
Gold Coast - Gold Coast Airport
Sunshine Coast - Sunshine Coast Airport
Townsville - Townsville Airport
South Australia
Adelaide - Adelaide Airport
Victoria
Melbourne - Melbourne Airport Hub
Tasmania
Hobart Airport Hub
Launceston Airport

Fleet

Current fleet
As of January 2023 the National Jet Systems fleet consists of the following aircraft:

Historic fleet
National Jet Systems previously also operated the following aircraft types:

 Boeing 727
 Boeing 737
 British Aerospace 146
 British Aerospace Jetstream
 De Havilland Canada Dash 8

Incidents
13 October 2010: A National Jet Systems Boeing 717-200, operating in Qantas livery, was close to stalling. The flight from Perth to Kalgoorlie had two 'stick shaker' (stall) warnings. They were caused by the pilot entering the wrong weight of the aircraft into the flight management system (FMS), and by the pilots not following correct stall recovery procedures.
27 May 2015: A National Jet Systems Boeing 717-200, operating from Brisbane to Gladstone in Qantas livery, was on its initial climb out of Brisbane when it suffered a 'stick shaker' (stall) warning. It was caused by the pilot retracting the flaps by mistake.

See also
List of airlines of Australia

References

External links

Airlines established in 1989
Australian companies established in 1989
Airlines of South Australia
Qantas
Companies based in Adelaide